The Jazz Messengers is the first studio album by the Jazz Messengers, released in 1956 by Columbia Records. It was their fourth overall album (after the two At the Cafe Bohemia live albums and the 1956 compilation), and also their last recording to feature the group's co-founder, Horace Silver, on piano.

In 1968, Columbia reissued the LP in their Jazz Odyssey Series with a new cover under the title Art Blakey with the Original Jazz Messengers. In 1997 the album was digitally remastered and released on CD, again with its original title and cover, featuring all the tracks from the original LP along with five additional tracks from the same recording sessions that were previously released only on foreign imports.

Track listing 
This is the track listing for the current Columbia CD release. Tracks 1−7 are from the original LP and in the same order (Columbia CL 897, 1956). The adjacent tracks 8−10 and 12 were first released on Originally (Columbia FC 38036, 1982). Track 11 was previously unreleased.

 "Infra-Rae" (Hank Mobley) - 6:57
 "Nica's Dream" (Horace Silver) - 11:51
 "It's You or No One" (Sammy Cahn, Jule Styne) - 5:36
 "Ecaroh" (Silver) - 6:02
 "Carol's Interlude" (Mobley) - 5:36
 "The End of a Love Affair" (E.C. Redding) - 6:43
 "Hank's Symphony" (Mobley) - 4:37
 "Weird-O" (Mobley) - 7:06
 "Ill Wind" (Harold Arlen, Ted Koehler) - 2:52
 "Late Show" (Mobley) - 7:09
 "Deciphering the Message" (Mobley) - 6:29
 "Carol's Interlude (alternate take)" (Mobley) - 6:13

Personnel 
 Art Blakey, drums
 Donald Byrd, trumpet
 Hank Mobley, tenor saxophone
 Horace Silver, piano
 Doug Watkins, bass

Versions 
 The Jazz Messengers (LP), Columbia, US, 1956
 The Jazz Messengers (LP), Philips, Europe, 1956
 Art Blakey with the Original Jazz Messengers (LP reissue) Columbia Jazz Odyssey Series, US, 1968
 The Jazz Messengers (LP reissue), Columbia, US, 1981
 The Jazz Messengers (CD, remastered), Columbia / Legacy, US and Europe, 1997
 The Jazz Messengers (2x 180 g LP reissue) Columbia / Pure Pleasure, US, 2011
 The Jazz Messengers (MC reissue) PolyGram Spain

References

External links 
  (with missing recording date; cf. other issues)

Art Blakey albums
The Jazz Messengers albums
1956 debut albums
Columbia Records albums
Albums recorded at CBS 30th Street Studio
Album covers by S. Neil Fujita